Autumn is a 1974 Soviet romance film directed by Andrei Smirnov.

Plot 
The film tells about a man and a woman who were in love with each other in their youth, then broke up and started new families, but did not become happy. And suddenly they meet each other again...

Cast 
 Natalya Rudnaya
 Leonid Kulagin
 Natalya Gundareva
 Aleksandr Fatyushin
 Lyudmila Maksakova
 Armen Dzhigarkhanyan		
 Igor Kashintsev
 Yuriy Kuzmenkov
 Vladimir Lysenkov
 Zoya Mokeyeva

References

External links 
 

1974 films
1970s Russian-language films
Soviet romance films
1970s romance films